Yeni Rize Şehir Stadium is a multi-use stadium in Rize, Turkey. It is currently used mostly for football matches and is the home ground of Çaykur Rizespor. The stadium has a capacity of 15,197 spectators and it opened in 2009. It replaced Rize Atatürk Stadium as the home of Çaykur Rizespor.

Football venues in Turkey
Sports venues in Rize
Çaykur Rizespor
Sports venues completed in 2009